

Eileanan Chearabhaigh is a collection of small uninhabited tidal islands off the south east coast of Benbecula in the Outer Hebrides of Scotland. The English language name Keiravagh Islands is sometimes used.

Bounded by the tidal waters of Loch Chearabhaigh to the north and Loch a' Laip to the south, the land area of the group defies a simple description. None of these individual islets are named by the Ordnance Survey. Argyll Yacht Charters supply a table of islands statistics that list the "Kiervagh islands" as being  in extent, although the method of measurement is not explicit.

The uninhabited island of Wiay lies to the south and fish farming is undertaken in the productive waters of Loch a' Laip and Loch Chearabhaigh. Loch a' Laip also provides shelter for visiting water craft but the area is strewn with rocks and skerries. There is a pier on Benbecula served by a track at the western end of Eileanan Chearabhaigh and another to the south at Eilean na Cille, although their use without local knowledge is not advised.

See also
Nearby islands with a similarly complex geography:
 Ceallasaigh Mòr
 Eileanan Iasgaich

Notes

Footnotes

References
 

Uist islands
Tidal islands of Scotland
Uninhabited islands of the Outer Hebrides